Eugenio Hermes Figueredo Aguerre (born 10 March 1932 in Santa Lucía, Uruguay) is a Uruguayan and American association football executive and former footballer. In May 2015, he was banned by FIFA Ethics Committee.

Biography

As a footballer, Figueredo played for Huracan Buceo as a right-half. He went on to serve as its president between 1971 and 1972, and again between 1976 and 77.

From 1997–2006, he presided over the Uruguayan Football Association, and from 1993 until 2013 he was vice president of CONMEBOL. In April 2013 he replaced Nicolás Leoz as President.

On 27 May 2015, Figueredo was arrested in Switzerland as the result of an FBI investigation into corruption in FIFA. In addition, the FIFA Ethics Committee found Figueredo to be guilty of taking bribes in 2004 and 2015 in connection with trade agreements for South American tournaments. He was fined one million Swiss francs ($1 million). Both Uruguay and the United States sought his extradition. He agreed to be extradited to Uruguay and was sent there on 24 December 2015. Figueredo was kept under house arrest in Uruguay. He was released from house arrest in December 2017.

On 2 October 2019, Figueredo was found guilty of bribery by the Ethics Committee and sanctioned with a ban for life on participating in any football-related activity.

In popular culture 
Chilean actor Sergio Hernández portrayed Figueredo in the 2020 Amazon Prime Video original series El Presidente.

References

1932 births
Living people
People from Santa Lucía, Uruguay
Uruguayan people of Galician descent
Uruguayan footballers
Association football midfielders
Huracán Buceo players
Uruguayan football chairmen and investors
Presidents of the Uruguayan Football Association
Presidents of CONMEBOL
Association football executives
People named in the Panama Papers
Uruguayan criminals